Gérald Martineau (July 31, 1902 – May 18, 1968) was a political boss in Quebec, Canada.

Background

He was born on July 31, 1902 in Quebec City and was a business person.

Political career

From the 1944 provincial election to the 1960 election, Martineau was the treasurer of the Union Nationale.

He was appointed to the Legislative Council of Quebec in 1946, representing the division of Les Laurentides until 1959 and the division of Lauzon from 1959 to 1967.

Martineau appeared before the Salvas Commission of Inquiry and was convicted on eight counts of fraud in 1967.

Death

He died on May 18, 1968.

References

1902 births
1968 deaths
Politicians from Quebec City
Union Nationale (Quebec) MLCs